The Latvia national under-21 football team represents the under-21s of Latvia and is controlled by the Latvian Football Federation, the governing body of football in Latvia. The team competes in the UEFA European Under-21 Football Championship, held every two years. The team is coached by Aleksandrs Basovs and is currently captained by defender Daniels Balodis.

Following the realignment of UEFA's youth competitions in 1976, under-21 football teams in Europe were formed, while Latvian team was formed only in 1991, after regaining independence from USSR. The team is exclusively for football players that are aged 21 or under at the start of the two-year campaign of the UEFA European Under-21 Football Championship meaning a player can represent the national team until the age of 23. Many U-21 players later represent the senior side.

Latvia U-21 have never yet qualified for the European U-21 championships, but has produced many players, who have become regular internationals for the senior side. Oskars Kļava, Deniss Ivanovs, Edgars Gauračs and Artjoms Rudņevs have all played for the U-21 side and are now first eleven players for Latvia internationally.

Latvia U-21 team plays its home matches at the Skonto stadions, which is also the home stadium of Latvia senior side. Before the opening of the Skonto stadions the team played its home matches in many different venues all around the country, including Ozolnieki, Daugavpils and Liepāja.

History 

As a team, Latvia U-21 was formed in 1992, after regaining independence from the USSR. The team played its first match in Vilnius, Lithuania on October 28, 1992 that ended in a 0-0 draw. The team firstly participated in the European Championship qualification in 1994, playing the first match in Riga against Ireland U-21 on September 6, that ended in a 1-1 draw. Since 2001 the team also participates in the Baltic Cup, winning in 2008. Since 1992 Latvia have already played more than 100 matches.

UEFA European Under-21 Football Championship

2023 UEFA European Under-21 Championship qualification

Results and fixtures

Players

Current squad
 The following players were called up for the 2022 Under-21 Baltic Cup.
 Match dates: 18 and 20 November 2022
 Opposition:  and 
 Caps and goals correct as of:' 27 September 2022, after the match against 

Recent call-ups
The following players have been capped in the past 12 months and are still eligible to represent.

Staff

Most capped players

Only official matches against U-21 national teams, not including against clubs or any other matches.Players in bold are still available to play for the U-21 National team.''

Best goalscorers

See also
Latvia football team
Latvia U-19
Latvia U-17

References

External links
 www.lff.lv

Under-21
European national under-21 association football teams